Talk About is a game show produced in Canada by CBC Television, which bears some similarities to the board game Outburst. Originally produced by CBC for the 1988–89 season, it was later picked up for American television syndication, airing from September 18, 1989 to March 16, 1990 with repeats later airing on the USA Network from June 28 to December 31, 1993, on GameTV from January 3, 2011 to September 2015, from July 1, 2019 to September 12, 2021, and since February 28, 2022, and on Buzzr starting May 30, 2022. Taped at stage 40 at the CBC Vancouver studios via local station CBUT in Vancouver, British Columbia, the show was hosted by Wayne Cox with local radio personality Dean Hill as announcer, while Doc Harris (announcer on Cox's previous show Second Honeymoon) filled in for Hill during Season 1.

During its original run on CBC, a concurrent prime time edition titled Celebrity Talk About was also added, which premiered on January 10, 1989.

Gameplay
Two teams of two people, one team usually returning champions, played.

Each round of play was conducted in the same manner. The game started with the champions playing first and each subsequent round saw the teams taking turns. The team that was not playing in a particular round was stationed at a desk to the side of the play area, where they would place headphones on their ears and keep their backs turned to their opponents so they could neither see nor hear anything. Cox would give the team playing a choice of two subjects to talk about. The team captain would then choose the subject and who would speak first.

Example: If the subject was South Coast Plaza, the ten words would be:
SAKS
FIFTH
AVENUE
BLOOMINGDALE'S
RESTAURANTS
RICH
EXPENSIVE
SHOPPING
MALL
CAROUSEL

There were ten words associated with each subject that were selected by the show's producers and the team tried to come up with as many as they could. Each word was worth one point and each team member had one chance to talk per round, having twenty seconds to do so. If, between them, the team could come up with all ten words, they won a  bonus and received ten points. If not, the points from the keywords they had already said could be stolen by the opposing team. After they were brought out of isolation, the other team was shown the keywords the other team had not said and given a chance to steal the points by correctly determining the subject the first team had talked about. If they could not, the points remained with the first team.

Play continued in this manner until one of the teams reached fifteen points. All players received a copy of the Talk About home game.

Games could straddle from the end of one episode to the start of the next. This rule was changed for celebrity specials; when time ran out at the end of an episode, the team in the lead won the game and received prizes for the charity sponsoring them; any tie would result in teams playing sudden-death rounds.

Any team that won five consecutive games retired undefeated and collected the Grand Game Jackpot.

Bonus round

The team captain chose one of two prizes to play for and one of two topics to discuss. They then decided which member would speak first, and their partner entered an isolation booth. As in the main game, the talking player had 20 seconds to say as many keywords as possible from a list of 10. Each word awarded ; if the talking player said all of them, the team immediately won  and the prize.

Any words that remained unsaid after 20 seconds were shown to the talking player, who then had to choose whether to continue the round or stop and take the accumulated money. If they chose to continue, their partner was brought out of the booth and had to try to come up with any of the unsaid words. One second was given for every word that had been said by the talking player, for a maximum of nine seconds. If the partner succeeded, the team won the prize and its bonus money was doubled; if not, it forfeited the money.

Home version
A home version of the game was produced by Pressman Toy Corporation in 1989. All contestants got a copy and Cox would originally plug it after every match. Later, Hill would plug it after coming back from the first commercial break.

A computer game of the show was produced by GameTek, but is fairly rare.

Foreign adaptations
A UK version of the show hosted by Andrew O'Connor ran for three years on ITV from 1990-1993. The only difference was in the bonus round, where each word was worth £20, and at the end, the player had two options: "doubling", by having their partner say any unsaid word or "double-doubling" (4 times the pounds) by having them say a specific word within a time limit of 1 second per word already said.

Lars Gustafsson hosted a Swedish version called Prata på! which ran briefly on TV4 in the mid-1990s. In the bonus round, each word was worth 500 kronor, and the "doubling" option required the partner to say any one of the unsaid words within a time limit of one second per word already said.

An Irish version of the show was broadcast by RTÉ in the early 1990s on Saturday nights, presented by Ian Dempsey. The show was brought back to RTÉ in the mid-1990s and was this time presented by Alan Hughes. After each team took two turns at talking, the higher scoring team played the bonus round in which each word earned £10 and one second for the other player to say one of the remaining words if the first player took the double-or-nothing option.

A Japanese version of the show was broadcast on Fuji TV titled 『クイズ!早くイッてよ』 (lit. "Quiz! Hurry and Go") from May 28, 1989, until September 27, 1992, hosted by Sekine Tsutomu. During the run of the show, there were two co-hosts: Tanaka Misako and Ayako Arana. The series worked slightly differently than the original show. When a team plays they keep what they earn, while if an opponent steals, they receive the remaining points available. During the second year of the show onward, the team picked a lucky monitor and if that team revealed an answer from there during their turn, they received two bonus points. Whichever team earned the most points at the end of round one battled against two celebrities (usually a comedic duo). The losing team goes home with 1,000 yen times the amount of points they earned. During the celebrity round, the co-hosts played with both teams. The team that receives the most points after that round goes on to the bonus. The bonus round was played usually for a vacation. The first person that went earned seconds with each answer on the board; if their partner guessed one of the remaining answers within the time limit they won the trip, and if not, they went away with parting gifts.

References

External links
 

1988 Canadian television series debuts
1990 Canadian television series endings
1980s Canadian game shows
1990s Canadian game shows
CBC Television original programming
English-language television shows
First-run syndicated television programs in the United States
Television shows filmed in Vancouver